Sisson is a surname that appeared in rural England around West Riding, Yorkshire in the 15th century. Notable people with the surname include:

 C. H. Sisson (1914–2003), British writer
 Fred Sisson (1879–1949), United States Representative from New York
 Jeremiah Sisson (1720–1783), British instrument maker
 John Richard Sisson (born 1936), acting president of the Ohio State University
 Jonathan Sisson (1690–1749), British instrument maker
 Marshall Sisson (1897–1978), British architect
 Rosemary Anne Sisson (1923–2017), British writer and screenwriter
 Rufus Sisson (1890–1977), American college basketball player

See also
 Sisson Documents, forged Russian documents which purported that Trotsky and Lenin were agents in the pay of the German government
 Sisson, California, now Mount Shasta, California, named after prominent land owner Justin Sisson
 Sissons (disambiguation)